Foundations of Science is a peer-reviewed interdisciplinary academic journal focussing on methodological and philosophical topics concerning the structure and the growth of science. It is the official journal of the Association for Foundations of Science, Language and Cognition and is published quarterly by Springer Science+Business Media. The journal was established in 1995. The editor in chief is Diederik Aerts.

Abstracting and indexing 
The journal is abstracted and indexed in Arts and Humanities Citation Index, Cengage,  EBSCO Databases, FRANCIS, Google Scholar, Mathematical Reviews, PASCAL, Science Citation Index Expanded, Scopus, and Zentralblatt MATH.

External links 
 
 Journal page at the Free University of Brussels

Philosophy of science journals
Philosophy of mathematics journals
Quarterly journals
Publications established in 1995
Springer Science+Business Media academic journals
English-language journals